Kal Chenar (also Romanized as Kal Chenār; also known as Kalchandār and Kaleh Chendār) is a village in Pian Rural District, in the Central District of Izeh County, Khuzestan Province, Iran. At the 2006 census, its population was 593, in 125 families.

References 

Populated places in Izeh County